Lee Cotton is an American writer, Pilates instructor, and healthy foods chef based in Florida. Her writing on pilates and cooking has appeared in magazines such as Atlantic Avenue Magazine, and she's been interviewed for Boca Life,  Jupiter Magazine, Fort Lauderdale Magazine, and other publications.

Biography
Cotton graduated from Florida State University with a B.S. in communications in 2000. After graduation she worked briefly in advertising. She graduated with a B.S in nutrition and dietetics. She is a RDN in the state of Florida.

She works in the field of nutrition in Florida.

Her writing and cooking has appeared in magazines such as Atlantic Avenue Magazine, and she's been interviewed for Boca Life,  Mirabels Magazine, Broward Design Magazine, Stuart Magazine, Jupiter Magazine, Palm Beacher Magazine, Fort Lauderdale Magazine, and Gold Coast Magazine. As of 2013 she also features in two eHow.com video series for Demand Studios and Demand Media, titled "Pure And Healthy Foods" and "Pilates Exercises."

References

External links
 PilatesandyourPalate.com

Living people
21st-century American women writers
Writers from Florida
Florida State University alumni
Pilates
American health care businesspeople
Year of birth missing (living people)
21st-century American businesspeople
21st-century American businesswomen
21st-century American non-fiction writers
American women non-fiction writers
American health and wellness writers